Trun may refer to:

Trun, Switzerland
Trun railway station, a Rhaetian Railway station
Trun, Orne, France
Tran, Bulgaria (using alternative transliteration)